In April 2003, the Province of British Columbia established the BC Ferry Authority, an independent, no-share capital corporation that holds the single issued voting share of the new British Columbia Ferry Services Inc. (BC Ferries), which was also established in April to reform the delivery of ferry transportation services in BC.

The purpose of the authority is to govern BC Ferries and to appoint its board of directors. While the current structure claims to ensure the operations of BC Ferries are independent from the provincial government, governance includes local politicians and provincial politicians have interfered with management decisions. As well, a government commission is involved with setting of fares.

External links
 BC Ferries
 BC Ferry Authority
 BC Ferry Commission

BC Ferries
British Columbia government departments and agencies